André Lauren Benjamin (born May 27, 1975), better known as André 3000, is an American rapper, singer, songwriter, record producer and actor. Born and raised in Atlanta, Georgia, he is best known for being one-half of southern hip hop duo Outkast, alongside fellow Atlanta-based rapper Big Boi. Benjamin has been ranked as one of the greatest rappers of all time by publications including Billboard, Complex, The Source, and About.com.

Benjamin has also acted in films and television series such as Families, The Shield, Be Cool, Revolver, Semi-Pro, High Life, Four Brothers, and in the lead role of Jimi Hendrix in All Is by My Side. He currently plays Fredwynn on the AMC series Dispatches from Elsewhere. He is also known for his Cartoon Network animated series Class of 3000 (2006–2008). He has additionally been an entrepreneur and an advocate for animal rights. In the spring of 2008, he launched a clothing line called Benjamin Bixby.

Early life
André Lauren Benjamin was born in Atlanta, Georgia on May 27, 1975, the only child of real estate seller Sharon Benjamin and collections agent Lawrence Harvey Walker. His single mother raised him in Atlanta, East Point, and Buckhead, where he attended Sarah Smith Elementary School, Sutton Middle School, Northside High School, McClarin Success Academy, and Tri-Cities High School. He was a childhood friend of Fonzworth Bentley.

Musical career

1992–2006: Beginnings and success with Outkast

In high school, Benjamin (who was then performing as André) met Antwan  " Big Boi " Patton. Benjamin and Patton teamed up to form Outkast. Shortly after graduating, Outkast was signed to the Atlanta-based LaFace label and released their debut album, Southernplayalisticadillacmuzik, in 1994. Buoyed by the success of the single "Player's Ball", the album went platinum by the end of the year and Outkast was named Best New Rap Group of the Year at the 1995 Source Awards.

On their next two albums, ATLiens (1996) and Aquemini (1998), Outkast experimented with their sound by adding elements of trip hop, soul, and jungle. The albums were also influenced by a return to traditional black music genres, with funk being the most prominent example. Outkast's style and lyricism again received commercial and critical acclaim. With the duo's portrayal of themselves as out-of-place extraterrestrials in ATLiens, Benjamin's lyrics, in particular, were noted for their surreal, space-age tinge: "the funkadelic, futuristic, and seemingly unfamiliar, weird, or eccentric persona projected by André 3000 creates the chance to transcend the more pronounced characterizations of gangstas and pimps so regularly assumed by black men rap artists." During the recording of these albums, Benjamin took up guitar, painting, and a relationship with singer Erykah Badu.

Outkast's fourth album, Stankonia (2000), introduced Benjamin's new alias André 3000 (largely to distinguish himself from Dr. Dre and his new persona after his split with Badu) and increased the group's crossover appeal with the single "Ms. Jackson", which hit #1 on the Billboard Hot 100. The song was written in the aftermath of Benjamin's breakup with Badu and was a fictionalized account of the disintegration of their relationship. In 2002, Outkast released a greatest hits album, Big Boi and Dre Present... OutKast, which contained three new tracks, one of which, "The Whole World", won a Grammy for Best Rap Performance by a Duo or Group. Later that year, Benjamin participated in the Dungeon Family group album, which saw some prominent Atlanta-based hip-hop groups combine into a supergroup. In 2002, André 3000 was referenced on the song "Till I Collapse" by Eminem, who considered him one of the best rappers ever.

In 2003 Outkast released Speakerboxxx/The Love Below, a double album that highlighted the differences in the musical styles of the group's two members. Though Big Boi's half of the album, Speakerboxxx, spawned the number-one hit "The Way You Move" and the relatively successful "Ghetto Musick", Benjamin's The Love Below garnered the most attention from mainstream audiences, with the popular singles "Hey Ya!" and "Roses" and their music videos receiving heavy radio and television airtime. "Prototype", the album's fourth single and video (Benjamin's third), was released shortly after. Unlike Speakerboxxx, The Love Below is an exercise in funk, jazz, and alternative music, featuring vocals from Benjamin which are mostly sung instead of rapped. Rolling Stone compared Benjamin to "an indie-rock Little Richard" on "Hey Ya!" and later declared the international hit one of The 500 Greatest Songs of All Time.

In 2006, Outkast released their sixth album as a group, Idlewild, which also served as a soundtrack to the group's musical film Idlewild. The film depicts life in a 1930s setting and the album takes influences from the music of that era, particularly blues. Benjamin had a few rapped verses on the album, including on the first single "Mighty O", but mostly stuck with singing, as he had on The Love Below. The album postponed the release of the theatrical film, as Benjamin and Patton were concentrated more on the production of the music than the movie. In an interview with Billboard in 2006, Benjamin explained that Outkast and its associates had developed the idea of creating a movie before the release of Aquemini, so that when it finally came time to collaborate on the movie, they already had most of the details worked out, including a script, and the movie was ultimately finished before the album was.

In January 2014, it was announced that Outkast would be reuniting to celebrate their 20th anniversary by performing at more than 40 festivals worldwide during the spring/summer of 2014, beginning with a headline spot at the Coachella Valley Music and Arts Festival in Indio, California in April.

2007–present: Solo career

Benjamin returned to rapping in 2007, after a hiatus from the genre, appearing on various remixes including "Walk It Out", "Throw Some D's", "You", and Jay-Z's "30 Something". His contributions to original songs included UGK's "International Players Anthem", Devin the Dude's "What a Job", Fonzworth Bentley's "Everybody", and Big Boi's "Royal Flush" alongside Raekwon. Benjamin also worked with Q-Tip on the song "Be Brave", which was supposed to be released on Q-Tip's 2008 album The Renaissance. He also appeared on the track "Green Light" from John Legend's album Evolver, which was released on October 28, 2008. Prior to the release, Benjamin commented: "It's going to be a surprise for a lot of John Legend fans because it is a lot more upbeat than John is—than people think John is. I was actually happy to hear it. This is a cool John Legend song." Benjamin has stated that he plans on recording a solo rap album and that the response to his remixes is part of the motivation for it. In 2010, he was featured on Ciara's remix for her single "Ride" from the album Basic Instinct, and on the remix to Chris Brown's "Deuces".

On January 18, 2011, Kesha released "The Sleazy Remix", which featured Benjamin. The remix was later re-released on December 13, 2011, also featuring verses by rappers Lil Wayne, Wiz Khalifa, and T.I. On June 7, Big Boi leaked a collaboration with Benjamin and Sleepy Brown entitled "Lookin' 4 Ya", which had originally been intended for Big Boi's debut solo album Sir Lucious Left Foot: The Son of Chico Dusty before it was blocked by Jive Records from appearing on the album.

On June 24, 2011, Beyoncé's fourth studio album, entitled 4, was released. Benjamin featured on the track "Party", his first collaboration with the singer. The song was later nominated for the Award for Best Rap/Sung Collaboration at the 2012 Grammy Awards. Benjamin continued his string of guest appearances throughout the year, featuring on Lloyd's song "Dedication to My Ex (Miss That)", Lil Wayne's "Interlude", and Drake's "The Real Her". He also featured on the track "Play the Guitar" by B.o.B.

Benjamin was featured alongside Jay-Z on Young Jeezy's track "I Do", released on January 10, 2012. It later appeared on Young Jeezy's fourth studio album Thug Motivation 103: Hustlerz Ambition. Benjamin's verse, which was initially recorded as a song for his debut solo album, was leaked onto the Internet in 2010. The following month, it was announced that Benjamin would be featured on a song with LCD Soundsystem frontman James Murphy and the alternative rock virtual band Gorillaz titled "DoYaThing", in order to promote the Gorillaz Converse collection. It was released on February 23, 2012, in two different versions, an approximately 4-and-a-half-minute radio edit and an explicit 13-minute version. The song was written and recorded over three days, with the 13-minute version being recorded on the last one.

On July 10, 2012, Channel Orange, the debut album by singer-songwriter and Odd Future member Frank Ocean, was released. Benjamin was featured on the song "Pink Matter", supplying vocals and guitar. Also in July 2012, Rick Ross's album God Forgives, I Don't featured Benjamin on the song "Sixteen", once again supplying vocals and guitar. Later in the year, Benjamin also featured on T.I.'s album Trouble Man: Heavy Is the Head on the song "Sorry". T.I. noted that the collaboration was a "proud moment" for him.

On May 6, 2013, the soundtrack for the 2013 film The Great Gatsby was released, featuring a cover by Benjamin and Beyoncé of Amy Winehouse's "Back to Black", marking their second collaboration. The following month, Capital Cities released their debut album, In a Tidal Wave of Mystery, on which Benjamin was featured on the song "Farrah Fawcett Hair".

After being seen in the studio with producer Mike Will Made It, it was reported on August 3, 2013, that Benjamin would be releasing a new solo album in early 2014. However, the following day a representative for Benjamin told Billboard that "there is no official confirmation on that report." In 2014, Benjamin appeared on fellow Dungeon Family member Future's second studio album, Honest, on a song titled "Benz Friendz (Whatchutola)".

In November 2015, Benjamin made a surprise guest appearance on the track "Hello" from Erykah Badu's mixtape But You Caint Use My Phone. In 2016, Benjamin performed background vocals on the track "30 Hours" by Kanye West from his album The Life of Pablo. Earlier that year, Benjamin revealed that he was in the process of recording new music. He also appeared on the song "Solo (Reprise)" by Frank Ocean off his album Blonde. In the song, Andre expresses his disappointment with the direction hip hop has taken in the more than twenty years since he started rapping. Benjamin also appeared on the track "the ends" from Travis Scott's second studio album, Birds in the Trap Sing McKnight. Also in 2016, he appeared on the song "Kids..." by A Tribe Called Quest from the album We Got It from Here... Thank You 4 Your Service and was featured on two tracks from Kid Cudi's album Passion, Pain & Demon Slayin'. He was also featured on the track "Rollinem 7's" on N.E.R.D's 2017 album No One Ever Really Dies.

On May 13, 2018, on Mother's Day, Benjamin released two surprise songs through his SoundCloud account, "Me&My (To Bury Your Parents)" and a 17-minute instrumental track, "Look Ma No Hands", which featured Benjamin on bass clarinet and James Blake on piano. Benjamin co-wrote and featured on "Come Home", the first track of Anderson .Paak's album Ventura, released on April 12, 2019. He also featured in a guest verse on "Where's the Catch" from James Blake's album Assume Form.

On September 3, 2021, as part of Drake's ongoing feud with Kanye West, Drake shared the West and Benjamin collaboration "Life of the Party" on his Sirius XM radio show. The unreleased track was originally intended to be on West's album Donda. Benjamin released a statement on the uncertified release explaining that the track was omitted from Donda due to West's current stance against profanity and remarked, "It's unfortunate that it was released in this way and two artists that I love are going back and forth." "Life of the Party" was released officially as part of a deluxe edition of Donda on November 14, 2021.

Artistry
Benjamin's early hip hop influence was Rakim, who inspired him to rap at school talent shows as a teenager. He was also heavily influenced by A Tribe Called Quest, stating that group member Q-Tip is "kind of like the father of all of us, like me, Kanye, Pharrell".

In the book How to Rap, several emcees praised his rapping technique; k-os noted Benjamin's intricate songwriting process and "wicked" flow, Fredro Starr of Onyx commended Benjamin's ability to unpredictably "change up [his] flow on every record", and David Banner said that Benjamin is "one of the best lyricists ever" despite his Southern drawl delivery. With the release of Outkast's Speakerboxxx/The Love Below album, Billboard stated that Benjamin had proved himself to be "an eccentric emo crooner and one of hip-hop's elite at the same time". Henry Adaso of About.com noted that in Benjamin's solo career, he had developed "a reputation for stealing the show with nearly every guest appearance". He has been ranked as one of the greatest rappers of all time by several publications; Billboard ranked him sixth, The Source and About.com ranked him 13th, and Complex ranked him 10th best of the 2000s.

Benjamin began producing music on Outkast's ATLiens album, and later co-founded the production team Earthtone III, which also consisted of Big Boi and Mr. DJ. On Speakerboxxx/The Love Below, he evolved his production by playing multiple live instruments, including keyboards, guitar, acoustic guitar, and tenor saxophone. He has since contributed outside production for Aretha Franklin, Frank Ocean, and Kids See Ghosts, among others. Scarface has called Benjamin the "Prince Rogers Nelson of Hip-Hop".

Acting career
Benjamin has made appearances in Families, The Shield (he plays Robert Huggins, a character that originated in an episode titled "On Tilt" from Season 3 in 2004), Be Cool, Revolver, Semi Pro, and Four Brothers. He was also cast as Percival in the Outkast film Idlewild, released on August 25, 2006, alongside the album of the same name. He voiced a crow in Charlotte's Web, a movie adaptation of the 1952 children's book.

As of November 2006, Benjamin voiced Sunny Bridges, a prize-winning musician who gives up touring to teach at his alma mater, in Class of 3000, an animated series on Cartoon Network which he also produced. He has also worked with Esthero on a promotional version of "Jungle Book" which was on a Wikked lil' grrrls sampler, but never made it to the actual album due to issues with Esthero's label, Warner Bros. The following year, Benjamin appeared in the basketball comedy Semi-Pro with Woody Harrelson and Will Ferrell. He also starred in Battle in Seattle, a 2007 film about the 1999 Seattle World Trade Organization protests.

Benjamin was a member of Quentin Tarantino and Lawrence Bender's production company A Band Apart until its close in 2006. Benjamin then formed his own company, Moxie Turtle. In May 2012, Benjamin began filming a biographical film about Jimi Hendrix entitled All Is By My Side. It premiered at the 2013 Toronto International Film Festival on September 7, 2013. His performance was met with critical acclaim and earned him a nomination for the Independent Spirit Award for Best Male Lead. In 2016, Benjamin had a recurring role as Michael LaCroix on the second season of the anthology crime drama series American Crime.

Fashion
Benjamin launched the "Benjamin Bixby" clothing line in the spring of 2008, which was inspired by college football from the mid-1930s.

Personal life
Benjamin was in a relationship with singer Erykah Badu from 1996 to 1999, and they had a son together named Seven Sirius Benjamin (born November 18, 1997).

In 2004, alongside Alicia Silverstone, Benjamin was voted by People for the Ethical Treatment of Animals (PETA) as the "World's Sexiest Vegetarian Celebrity". He previously followed a vegan diet but stated in 2014, "I was a hardcore vegan for 15 years. I've even done raw. But socially it became horrible. I was kind of just sitting at home eating a salad. You become mean. That's not good for you."

Benjamin posed for a print advertising campaign by Declare Yourself, a campaign encouraging voter registration among youth for the 2008 United States presidential election. In the ads by photographer David LaChapelle, he had his mouth gagged by a bow-tie in a symbolic function.

Discography

With Outkast
 Southernplayalisticadillacmuzik (1994)
 ATLiens (1996)
 Aquemini (1998)
 Stankonia (2000)
 Speakerboxxx/The Love Below (2003)
 Idlewild (2006)

Filmography
Films

Television

Video game

Awards and nominations
Grammy Awards

References

Further reading

External links

 
 
 

1975 births
Living people
20th-century American rappers
21st-century American male actors
21st-century American rappers
African-American male actors
African-American male guitarists
African-American male rappers
African-American male singers
African-American male singer-songwriters
African-American record producers
African-American rock musicians
American hip hop record producers
American hip hop singers
American male film actors
American male guitarists
American male singer-songwriters
American male television actors
American male voice actors
American philanthropists
Dungeon Family members
Grammy Award winners for rap music
Guitarists from Georgia (U.S. state)
Male actors from Atlanta
Outkast members
Rappers from Atlanta
Record producers from Georgia (U.S. state)
Singer-songwriters from Georgia (U.S. state)
Southern hip hop musicians